Between 1879 and 1916, a total of 42 ships made 87 voyages, carrying Indian indentured labourers to Fiji. Initially the ships brought labourers from Calcutta, but from 1903 all ships except two also brought labourers from Madras and Mumbai. A total of 60,965 passengers left India but only 60,553 (including births at sea) arrived in Fiji. A total of 45,439 boarded ships in Calcutta and 15,114 in Madras. Sailing ships took, on average, seventy-three days for the trip while steamers took 30 days. The shipping companies associated with the labour trade were Nourse Line and British-India Steam Navigation Company.

The most important man on these ships was the Surgeon-Superintendent, who supervised the medical care, ventilation, clothing, cleanliness and exercise of the passengers and his authority extended over the Captain. He inspected the stores before departure and reported on any defects during the trip. The Surgeon-Superintendent also intervened to prevent passengers from being mistreated by the crew. He was paid a bonus for each labourer landed alive.

List of ships 
The table below provides details of the 87 voyages made by the 40 ships that brought Indian Indentured Labourers to Fiji. Of these ships, 27 were sailing ships and 13 were steam ships.

Notes 
 The number following the name of the ship denotes the voyage number (to Fiji).
 "SS" in front of the name of the ship denotes that it was a steam ship.
 From 1905 all ships were steam ships.

See also 
Colonial Sugar Refining Company (Fiji)

Indian indenture system
Repatriation of indentured Indians from Fiji

 
Ships of India
British India
Colony of Fiji
Fiji sugar industry
Indian diaspora in Fiji
Coolie trade
Debt bondage
Demographic history of India
Indentured servitude
Labour in Fiji
Labour in India
Victorian-era passenger ships of the United Kingdom
British India-related lists
Social history-related lists